Lake View is an unincorporated community in Douglas County, Kansas, United States.  It is located 1 mile north of Lawrence.

History
Lake View was established in 1892 as a lake side resort and was in use until the 1930s.  The Lake View club continues to maintain the oxbow lake.

A post office was opened in Lake View (but spelled Lakeview) in 1898, and remained in operation until it was discontinued in 1914.

Lake View was a station on the Atchison, Topeka and Santa Fe Railway.

References

Further reading

External links
 Douglas County maps: Current, Historic, KDOT

Unincorporated communities in Douglas County, Kansas
Unincorporated communities in Kansas
Oxbow lakes of the United States
Lakes of Kansas